This is a timeline of the history of the Khitans. The Khitans were a nomadic people in northeastern Asia related to the Xianbei. Following the collapse of the Tang dynasty, they established the Liao dynasty in 916, encompassing parts of modern-day northern China, Mongolia, and North Korea. The Liao dynasty was eventually conquered by the Jin dynasty in 1125. Remnants of the Liao court led by Yelü Dashi fled westward to Central Asia where they established the Western Liao dynasty. In 1211, the Western Liao throne was usurped by a Naiman called Kuchlug. In 1218, the Mongol Empire defeated and conquered the Western Liao dynasty.

4th century

6th century

7th century

8th century

9th century

10th century

900s

910s

920s

930s

940s

950s

960s

970s

980s

990s

11th century

1000s

1010s

1020s

1030s

1040s

1050s

1060s

1070s

1080s

1090s

12th century

1100s

1110s

1120s

1130s

1140s

1150s

1160s

1170s

1180s

1190s

13th century

1200s

1210s

1220s

1230s

1250s

1270s

1280s

1290s

14th century

19th century

See also
Administrative divisions of the Liao dynasty

References

Bibliography

 .

 (alk. paper)

 

  (paperback).
 

 
 .

 

 
 

 
 

 

 
  
 

 
 

 
Liao
History of Mongolia
History of Manchuria
Khitan history
Khanates
Nomadic groups in Eurasia
10th century in China
.
.
10th century in Mongolia
11th century in Mongolia
Khitans